Geraldine was a former parliamentary electorate in the South Canterbury region of New Zealand that existed three times from 1875 to 1911. It was represented by six Members of Parliament.

Population centres
In December 1887, the House of Representatives voted to reduce its membership from general electorates from 91 to 70. The 1890 electoral redistribution used the same 1886 census data used for the 1887 electoral redistribution. In addition, three-member electorates were introduced in the four main centres. This resulted in a major restructuring of electorates, and Geraldine was one of eight electorates to be re-created for the 1890 election.

History
The electorate was formed for the 1875–1876 election, which was held on 27 December 1875 in this electorate. Edward Wakefield, John Hayhurst and Alexander Wilson contested the election, and gained 102, 102 and 44 votes, respectively. The returning officer thus used his casting vote and returned Wakefield as elected. In the 1881 election, Wakefield was defeated by William Postlethwaite.

The electorate was abolished for the 1887 election and the town of Geraldine was covered by the Rangitata electorate.

Geraldine was re-established for the 1890 election, and replaced again for the 1893 election; this time by the Pareora electorate. At the 1893 general election Frederick Flatman won Pareora from Arthur Rhodes the former Geraldine MP.

Geraldine was established for the third time for the 1896 election. It existed until 1911.

Members of Parliament
Geraldine was represented by six Members of Parliament:

Key

Election results

1899 election

1896 election

1890 election

1884 election

Notes

References

Historical electorates of New Zealand
1875 establishments in New Zealand
1890 establishments in New Zealand
1896 establishments in New Zealand
1887 disestablishments in New Zealand
1893 disestablishments in New Zealand
1911 disestablishments in New Zealand